A. Wayne Slawson (Dec. 29, 1932-) is a composer and professor. Best known for Wishful Thinking About Winter, composed at MIT in 1967, a computer-generated setting of a haiku that uses a wide range of spectral glide rates.

Bibliography
"A Speech-Orientated Synthesizer for Computer Music"
"Sound, Electronics, and Hearing", The Development and Practice of Electronic Music. Jon H. Appleton and Ronald Perera, eds. .

Discography
Wishful Thinking About Winter. Decca DL 710180.

Sources

Further reading
Routledge (2009). "Slawson, A. Wayne", International Who's Who in Classical Music 2009, p. 765. .

American male composers
21st-century American composers
Living people
21st-century American male musicians
Year of birth missing (living people)